Rumakali Hydroelectric Power Station is a 222 megawatts hydroelectric power station under construction in Tanzania. The power station is under development by a consortium comprising Tanzania Electric Supply Company Limited (TANESCO), the government-owned electricity utility company and the China Gezhouba Group. The power generated at this power station will be sold to TANESCO, for integration into the national electric grid.

Location
The power station is located across the Rumakali River, northwest of the town of Njombe, in the Njombe District of the Njombe Region, in southwestern Tanzania.

Overview
In 2020, a consortium consisting of the engineering firms Multiconsult of Norway, Norplan Tanzania Limited and Tanzania Photomap Limited, was awarded the contract, worth over US$6 million, for a feasibility study and preparation of tender documents. Multiconsult was the lead, with the other two being sub-contractors. Work included feasibility studies for the two dams, the 338 MW Ruhudji Hydroelectric Power Station and the 222 MW Rumakali Hydroelectric Power Station. Other tasks included in the contracts involves preparation of conceptual design and tender documents, and conduct of environmental and social impact assessment studies for the two power stations and associated evacuation transmission power lines.

Construction costs
The most recent cos estimates are reported at US$553 million, inclusive of the high voltage transmission line to carry the energy to a substation where it will be integrated into the national grid.

Other considerations
In 2011, TANESCO had agreed for a Russian company, Zarubezhstroy Corporation, to build this power station at a price of US$700 million, over a five-year period. However those plans did not materialize.

See also

 List of power stations in Tanzania
 Njombe Region
 Njombe District

References

External links
 Tanzania Government Appoints Contractors for Hydropower Projects As of 4 August 2021.

Power stations in Tanzania
Njombe Region
Hydroelectric power stations in Tanzania
Dams in Tanzania